Petitilla is a genus of sea snails, marine gastropod mollusks in the family Pyramidellidae, the pyrams and their allies.

Species
Species within the genus Petitilla include:
 Petitilla crosseana (Dall, 1885)

References

 Wise, J. B. 1997. Petitilla, new name for Petitella Wise,1996, a preoccupied name (Mollusca: Gastropoda: Pyramidellidae).The Nautilus 110(2): 76.

External links
 To ITIS
 To World Register of Marine Species

Pyramidellidae
Monotypic gastropod genera